Deux-Montagnes is a provincial electoral district in Quebec, Canada, that elects members to the National Assembly of Quebec. It consists of the cities of Deux-Montagnes and Saint-Eustache.

It was created for the 1867 election (and an electoral district of that name existed earlier in the Legislative Assembly of the Province of Canada).

Members of the Legislative Assembly / National Assembly

Linguistic demographics
Francophone: 89.7%
Anglophone: 8.3%
Allophone: 2%

Electoral results

|}

|}

^ Change is from redistributed results. CAQ change is from ADQ.

|-
 
|Liberal
|Marie-France D'Aoust
|align="right"|8,980
|align="right"|32.39
|align="right"|+8.45

|-

|-

|-
|}

|-
 
|Liberal
|Paule Fortier
|align="right"|8,183
|align="right"|23.94
|align="right"|-14.05
|-

|-

|Independent
|Manon Bissonnette
|align="right"|114
|align="right"|0.33
|align="right"|-

|}
QS vote compared to UFP vote 2003

References

External links
Information
 Elections Quebec

Election results
 Election results (National Assembly)

Maps
 2011 map (PDF)
 2001 map (Flash)
2001–2011 changes (Flash)
1992–2001 changes  (Flash)
 Electoral map of Laurentides region
 Quebec electoral map, 2011

Quebec provincial electoral districts
Saint-Eustache, Quebec